The Foutanké or Fouta is a breed or type of light horse from Senegal, in West Africa. It results from the cross-breeding of a Fleuve stallion with an M'Bayar mare; its conformation is similar to that of the Fleuve. It is one of the four recognised Senegalese horse breeds – the others being the M'Bayar, the Fleuve and the M'Par – and is highly valued for horse-racing.

History 

The origins of the horse in Senegal are not documented. In 1996, Senegal had a horse population of about 400,000 head, the largest of any West African country. This was a substantial increase from the 216,000 reported in 1978, and a much greater increase from the population after the Second World War, estimated at barely 30,000. Population numbers for the Foutanké are not reported. In 2007 the FAO did not have data from which to estimate the conservation status of the breed.

References

Horse breeds
Horse breeds originating in Senegal